Jüri is a small borough in Harju County, northern Estonia. Jüri is the administrative centre of Rae Parish. Jüri has a population of 3,426 as of 1 January 2012. In 2011, Jüri was the center of population of Estonia.

Jüri has grown out of two parts: the centre of Sommerling kolkhoz (former Rosenhagen Manor) in the west and construction industry base with a residential area (former Jüri church and village) in the east. In the middle there is a protected Lehmja oak grove.

In the 1630s the Rosenhagen Manor (Lehmja since 1917) was established; nowadays the site is located in western Jüri. Today, though the wooden main building has been destroyed, several side buildings such as the workers house have remained.

The earlier Jürgens (Jüri) church was probably located in Karla in 1401. The current church in Jüri was built in 1885 on the site of a medieval church building. From 1713 to 1748, Anton thor Helle, the translator of the first Estonian Bible, was the pastor in Jürgens.

Demographics

References

External links
Rae Parish 
Jüri Health Centre 
Jüri Gymnasium 
Jüri Library 
Jüri church parish 

Boroughs and small boroughs in Estonia
Kreis Harrien